Feryal is a female given name. Notable people with the name include:

 Feryal Behzad, Iranian film director
 Feryal Clark, British politician
 Feryal Özel (born 1975), Turkish-American astrophysicist

Iranian feminine given names
Turkish feminine given names